Chinook is a city in and the county seat of Blaine County, Montana, United States. The population was 1,185 at the 2020 census. Points of interest are the Bear Paw Battlefield Museum located in the small town's center and the Bear Paw Battlefield, located twenty miles south of Chinook.

Name
The city is named for the Chinook wind, a warm wind on eastern side of the Rocky Mountains. It is said to be named after Thinker, a half-Assiniboine, half-white man and general store manager whose English name was Thomas O'Hanlon. O'Hanlon founded the town in 1871.

Geography
Chinook is located at  (48.5894, -109.2321). U.S. Route 2 cuts through town. Chinook is located on Lodge Creek, where it empties into the Milk River, which flows south of town.

Demographics

2010 census
As of the census of 2010, there were 1,203 people, 599 households, and 313 families residing in the city. The racial makeup of the city was 88.4% White, 9.3% Native American, 0.3% Asian, 0.1% from other races, and 1.9% from two or more races. Hispanic or Latino of any race were 1.2% of the population.

There were 599 households, of which 23.7% had children under the age of 18 living with them, 39.9% were married couples living together, 9.2% had a female householder with no husband present, 3.2% had a male householder with no wife present, and 47.7% were non-families. 43.9% of all households were made up of individuals, and 21.2% had someone living alone who was 65 years of age or older. The average household size was 2.01 and the average family size was 2.79.

The median age in the city was 46.7 years. 21.4% of residents were under the age of 18; 5.6% were between the ages of 18 and 24; 20.4% were from 25 to 44; 29.1% were from 45 to 64; and 23.4% were 65 years of age or older. The gender makeup of the city was 48.9% male and 51.1% female.

2000 census
As of the census of 2000, there were 1,386 people, 657 households, and 375 families residing in the city. The population density was 2,693.2 people per square mile (1,049.3/km2). There were 732 housing units at an average density of 1,422.4 per square mile (554.2/km2). The racial makeup of the city was 91.34% White, 0.36% African American, 6.35% "Native American", 0.07% Asian, 0.29% from other races, and 1.59% from two or more races. Hispanic or Latino of any race were 0.58% of the population.

There were 657 households, out of which 26.3% had children under the age of 18 living with them, 45.4% were married couples living together, 9.9% had a female householder with no husband present, and 42.9% were non-families. 39.6% of all households were made up of individuals, and 21.6% had someone living alone who was 65 years of age or older. The average household size was 2.10 and the average family size was 2.84.

In the city, the population was spread out, with 23.6% under the age of 18, 5.3% from 18 to 24, 24.0% from 25 to 44, 23.4% from 45 to 64, and 23.7% who were 65 years of age or older. The median age was 43 years. For every 100 females there were 89.6 males. For every 100 females age 18 and over, there were 86.8 males.

The median income for a household in the city was $25,461, and the median income for a family was $35,577. Males had a median income of $26,667 versus $20,179 for females. The per capita income for the city was $16,038. About 12.1% of families and 17.3% of the population were below the poverty line, including 20.8% of those under age 18 and 20.1% of those age 65 or over.

Climate
Chinook experiences a semi-arid climate (Köppen BSk) with long, cold, dry winters and hot, wetter summers.

Infrastructure
Edgar G. Obie Airport is located 1 mile west of Chinook.

Chinook High School Sugarbeeters 
Chinook High School experienced national notoriety when a USA today contest was held to discover the nation's oddest mascot. Chinook's mascot, the Sugarbeeter, finished third in the voting and has since been the topic of multiple articles.

Chinook has been home to the Sugarbeeters ever since the Utah-Idaho Sugar Company, which had a factory in the town, helped purchase the jerseys for the boys' basketball team in 1929. Ever since the team made their debut in the jerseys, which presented a Sugarbeet logo on the front, the nickname has been fully adopted.

Education
Chinook Public Schools serves students from kindergarten to 12th grade. Chinook High School is a Class C school (less than 108 students) which helps determine athletic competitions.

Chinook is home to the Blaine County Library.

Notable people
 Elliott Blackstone, sergeant of the San Francisco Police Department and longtime advocate for LGBT rights.
 Chet Blaylock, former member of the Montana State Senate, taught at a school in the city.
 U.S. Grant Sharp, Jr., former United States Navy four star admiral and Commander in Chief of the United States Pacific Fleet.

References

External links

 City of Chinook

Cities in Blaine County, Montana
County seats in Montana
Chinook Jargon place names
Cities in Montana